Yosef Qafiḥ, widely known as Rabbi Yosef Kapach (27 November 1917 –  21 July 2000), was a Yemenite-Israeli authority on Jewish religious law (halakha), a dayan of the Supreme Rabbinical Court in Israel, and one of the foremost leaders of the Yemenite Jewish community in Israel, where he was sought after by non-Yemenites as well. He is widely known for his editions and translations of the works of Maimonides, Saadia Gaon, and other early rabbinic authorities (Rishonim), particularly his restoration of the Mishneh Torah from old Yemenite manuscripts and his accompanying commentary culled from close to 300 additional commentators and with original insights. He was the grandson of Rabbi Yiḥyah Qafiḥ, a prominent Yemenite leader and founder of the Dor Deah movement in Yemen. Qafih was the recipient of many awards, as well as an Honorary Doctorate from Bar-Ilan University.

Biography
Yosef Qafiḥ was born  27 November 1917  in Sana’a in Yemen. His father was Rabbi David Qafiḥ, who died after being assaulted by an Arab man, when his son Yosef was less than one year old. At the age of five, Yosef also lost his mother and was raised by his grandfather Rabbi Yiḥyah Qafiḥ, under whom he studied Torah. In 1927, Yosef helped his grandfather retrieve the oldest complete Mishnah commentary from the Jewish community's genizah in Sana'a, containing Rabbi Nathan ben Abraham's elucidation of difficult words and passages in the Mishnah. The commentary was later published in Israel. (Young children in Yemen were often employed as copyists of ancient manuscripts.) At the age of thirteen, Yosef wrote out a complete copy of Maimonides' Guide for the Perplexed in Judeo-Arabic.

When Yosef was 14, his grandfather died. When he and two of his acquaintances went to visit the burial-site of Yosef's grandfather, and then his father, they were accused of having burnt the grave of his grandfather's chief disputant, and were arrested and held in bonds. Because of the rift in the community between those who adhered to kabbalah and the rationalists, the two informers told the Arab authority about the young Yosef being a Jewish orphan, and that under the laws of the state's Orphans' Decree he was required to be taken under the arms of the Islamic State and converted to Islam. The child was questioned about his father and upon the realization that his forced conversion to Islam was the informants' intent–with the arson accusation being a means to render him vulnerable to Muslim authority and attention–he did not answer his interrogator, and was released by the prison authority for no explained reason. The Imam, Yahya Muhammad Hamid ed-Din, urgently requested that they find him a bride to bypass forced conversion to Islam as an orphaned child. Rabbi Yihye al-Abyadh (the king's physician) arranged for Yosef's marriage to Bracha Saleh (Tzadok) in the same year of his grandfather's passing. In his early years, he worked as a silversmith.

In 1943 he immigrated to Mandatory Palestine, where he studied at the Mercaz HaRav yeshiva and qualified as a dayan at the Harry Fischel Institute. In 1950 he was appointed as a dayan (rabbinic judge) in the Jerusalem district court. After Rabbi Ovadia Yosef was invited to serve on the Jerusalem beth din in 1958, in addition to Rabbi Qafih and Rabbi Waldenberg, rabbis Qafih and Yosef together would constitute a non-Ashkenazic majority in the beit din of three. In 1970, Qafih was appointed as a dayan in the Supreme Rabbinical Court. Throughout the course of more than half a century, numerous rabbis sat on various rabbinical courts with him, including Rabbis Tzvi Pesach Frank, Yosef Shalom Eliashiv, Ovadia Yosef, Avraham Shapira, Mordechai Eliyahu, and the Tzitz Eliezer.

Rabbi Yosef Qafiḥ was a member of the Chief Rabbinate Council of Israel and president of the Yemenite community in Jerusalem. He died on 21 July 2000 at the age of 82, and is buried in Jerusalem's Har HaMenuchot cemetery.

Scholarship
His main work in the field of Torah literature was his translation and publication of manuscripts of numerous works by Sephardic Rishonim, including HaNivchar BeEmunot u'va-Deot of Saadia Gaon, the Torat Chovot HaLevavot by Bahya ibn Pakuda, the Kuzari by Judah ha-Levi and many other works in Judaeo-Arabic. The prime place in his oeuvre is reserved for the writings of Maimonides: he translated the Guide for the Perplexed, Commentary on the Mishnah, Sefer Hamitzvot, letters and Beiur M'lekhet HaHiggayon and edited a 24-volume set of the Mishneh Torah (posthumously divided into 25).  His works and translations received recognition from the academic and Rabbinic world alike. His edition of Maimonides' Commentary on the Mishnah in particular is a regularly cited source in ArtScroll's Yad Avraham Mishnah Series, with Rabbis Nosson Scherman and Meir Zlotowitz recognizing it as a "justly acclaimed translation of what is assumed to be Rambam's own manuscript." Rabbi Ovadia Yosef wrote that the seven years he sat with "the great Gaon Rabbi Yosef Qafiḥ ZT"L" in the beth din were "seven good years" and that Rabbi Qafiḥ toiled over his Torah day and night.

Qafih wrote extensively about the heritage of Yemenite Jews, describing in a book, “Halichot Teman”, the Jewish life in Yemen, eclipsing even the renowned works of Amram Qorah and ethnographer, Yaakov Sapir. He published several works of Yemenite Jewish provenance, such as Meor ha-Afelah by Nethanel ben Isaiah (14th-century), and Garden of the Intellects by Natan'el al-Fayyumi (12th-century). He also published a book under the title of “Shivat Tzion” Tiklal, a Yemenite prayer book reflecting the views of Maimonides in three volumes.  In 1993 he published a new version under the title of “Siaḥ Yerushalayim” in four volumes (posthumously edited to six). Qafiḥ's seminal work, however, was his commentary on Maimonides' Mishne Torah, where he highlighted textual variations based on the Yemenite handwritten manuscripts of Maimonides' Code of Jewish law. Qafiḥ identified with the Dor Dai tendency, except that he did not publicly express opposition to the Zohar beyond saying that it was preferable to draw sustenance from the teachings of Maimonides. In his leadership of the Yemenite community in Israel he endeavored to maintain peace between the main factions in the community and worked to preserve Yemenite customs. In matters pertaining to Yemenite customs, even where later customs conflict with the earlier custom, Rabbi Mordechai Eliyahu regarded the opinion of Rabbi Qafiḥ, who he called Mori Yusef (Hebrew: מארי יוסף), to be decisive.<ref>{{Cite web|date=2014-08-03|title=הייד פארק - מרכז פורומים ישראלי | 31 - עלון אור ההליכות גליון חודש תמוז התשע|url=http://www.hydepark.co.il/topic.asp?cat_id=24&topic_id=3032054&forum_id=20067|access-date=2022-01-17|archive-url=https://web.archive.org/web/20140803173109/http://www.hydepark.co.il/topic.asp?cat_id=24&topic_id=3032054&forum_id=20067|archive-date=2014-08-03}}</ref>

The fruit of Rabbi Qafiḥ's scholarship remains, for the most part, untranslated and as such largely inaccessible to the English-speaking public. Examples of English translations based on his bilingual (Hebrew/Arabic) editions include Saadia on Job by Dr. Lenn E. Goodman, Professor of Philosophy and Jewish Studies, and Maimonides' Sefer Hamitzvot by Rabbi Berel Bell, Dayan of Kehilas Lubavitch on the Beth Din of Montreal and the founding dean of Chaya Mushka Seminary.

Legacy
Rabbi Qafih's followers observe halakhah as codified in Maimonides' Mishneh Torah with Qafih's commentary. Halakhic literature stemming from the rulings of Maimonides and Qafih has been published, often as essays. Although Rabbi Qafih had serious reservations about learning halakhah from halakhic compendiums and abridgments, for the benefit of the general public his students have published books to aid in following the rulings of Maimonides and Qafih. Among these works, the following has been published:
 ברכת משה על הלכות ברכות by Rabbi Aviad Ashwal, on the laws of b'rakhoth;
 מועדי משה: הלכות חנוכה by Rabbi Aviad Ashwal, on the laws of Chanukkah;
 טהרת מש"ה by Rabbi Tzfanya Arusi, on the laws of family purity;
 שמטת משה על הלכות שביעית by Rabbi Aviad Ashwal, on the laws of Shmitta.

Of note is an index volume of sorts, Lanhotam (Hebrew title: לַנְחֹתָם דרך 'משנה תורה'), by Yosi Seri which is a reference guide for learners of the Mishneh Torah with Rabbi Qafih's commentary.

Written responsa of Rabbi Qafih have been printed (listed below in Published Works) and continue to be publicized on a monthly basis in Allon Or Hahalichot. Responsa drawn from Rabbi Qafih in oral conversations have been put to writing in תשובות הרב יוסף קאפח לתלמידו תמיר רצון (edited by Rabbi Itamar Cohen) and שו"ת טל יוסף: הרב יוסף קאפח of Rabbi Shmuel Tal.

Alongside the written works, shiurim rooted in Maimonidean doctrine and the exposition of Rabbi Qafih's teachings are given on a regular basis by a number of Rabbis in Israel such as Rabbis Ratzon Arusi, Uri Melammed, and Elyaqim Tzadoq. Shiurim of Rabbi Ratzon Arusi, Qafih's foremost student, are made freely available at net-sah.org.

Close to 10 volumes of the Masorah L'Yosef journal have been published which include essays by authors of various persuasions that deal with Maimonides' and Rabbi Yosef Qafih's teachings. Other publications of note, with essays relating to Qafih's teachings, include ספר זכרון לרב יוסף בן דוד קאפח, From Yemen to Israel (Hebrew: מתימן לישראל), and דברי שלום ואמת.

Of special note among Rabbi Yosef Qafih's expounders is Rabbi Aharon Qafih who in addition to giving many weekly shiurim has published, among numerous essays, the books יריעות אהרן and מנחת אהרן devoted to Maimonidean doctrine and the teachings of Rabbi Yosef Qafih.

Published works
 Saadia Gaon:
 Sefer Yetzira, with Saadia Gaon's version of the text itself along with his Arabic commentary with facing Hebrew translation.
 Translations into Hebrew of Saadya Gaon's Arabic translation and commentary on Tanakh have included volumes on the Torah, Megillot, Tehillim, Iyyov (translated to English by Dr. L. E. Goodman), Mishlei, and Daniel. (Although, on its own, Saadia on Isaiah was not translated by Kafih, he sometimes translated portions that he quoted, while at other times he referred readers to Derenbourg's edition.In a different context Kafih referred to Dr. N. [Naftali Joseph] Derenbourg as having satisfactorily translated and published, from and with the Judeo-Arabic, Maimonides' commentary to Taharot (Kafih edition of the Mishnah with Maimonides' commentary, Seder Zera'im, p. 10).)
 Megillath Antiyuchas (Hebrew: מגלת אַנְטִיוּכַס) with Saadya Gaon's Arabic translation and the extant portion of his introduction with facing Hebrew translation.
 HaNivchar BeEmunot U'va-Deot (Hebrew: הנבחר באמונות ובדעות) in original Arabic with facing Hebrew translation.
 Torat Chovot HaLevavot in original Arabic with facing Hebrew translation.
 Commentary on the entire six orders of the Mishnah by an early Yemenite ḥakham, translated into Hebrew from the original Arabic.
 The Rif on Tractate Chullin with a commentary by an early Jewish Yemenite ḥakham in original Arabic with facing Hebrew translation.
 Kuzari in original Arabic with facing Hebrew translation.
 Gan HaSikhlim (Garden of the Intellects), written ca. 1147, by Rabbeinu Nathanel Beirav Fayyumi, in original Arabic with facing Hebrew translation.
 Questions and Responsa of the Ra'avi (Abraham ben Isaac) Av Beth Din (Hebrew: שאלות ותשובות הראב"י אב"ד).
 Maimonides:
 Beiur M'lekhet HaHiggayon, the first compilation of Maimonides, in original Arabic with facing Hebrew translation as well as various commentaries.
 Maimonides' Commentary on the Mishnah, in original Arabic with facing Hebrew translation (later editions have Hebrew only, in three volumes).
 A selection from Pereq Ḥeleq (Maimonides' commentary on the tenth chapter of Sanhedrin) was translated to English per Rabbi Kafih's edition by Charles E. Butterworth and Raymond L. Weiss in Ethical Writings of Maimonides (New York, 1975).Fred Rosner published an English translation of Maimonides' entire commentary on Tractate Sanhedrin (published as Maimonides Commentary on the Mishnah: Tractate Sanhedrin [New York, 1981]) for which Rabbi Kafaḥ's Hebrew translation was one of two major source works used, his second major source work being "the annotated Hebrew translation of Gottlieb (Hanover. 1906)" (p. xvi-xvii).
In an earlier translation of his Rosner published Moses Maimonides' Commentary on the Mishnah: Introduction to Seder Zeraim and Commentary on Tractate Berachoth (New York, 1975), but Kapach's translation was not central to this with Al Harizi's Hebrew translation being the major source work used, although Rosner noted that "[c]onsultation with the new Hebrew translation of Kapach was very valuable in many instances" (p. 32-33).
 Eight Chapters (Maimonides' Introduction to Tractate Avoth) was translated to English, primarily per Rabbi Kafih's edition, by Charles E. Butterworth and Raymond L. Weiss in Ethical Writings of Maimonides (New York, 1975), p. 60-104.
 Mishneh Torah (Hebrew: מִשׁנֵה תּוֹרָה) of the Rambam, published according to ancient Yemenite manuscripts, with his own commentary (23-25 volumes). 
 Sefer HaMadda` (Hebrew: סֵפֶר הַמַּדָּע): Volume 1: הקדמת הרמב"ם. מנין המצוות. תוכן ההלכות של כל ספר משנה תורה. ספר המדע: הִלכּוֹת יסודי התורה, הלכות דעות, הלכות תלמוד תורה, הלכות עבודה זרה וחקות הגוים, הלכות תשובה
 Sefer Ahavah (Hebrew: ספר אַהֲבָה): Volume 2: ספר אהבה: הלכות קרית שמע, הלכות תפלה וברכת כהנים, הלכות תפלין ומזוזה וספר תורה, הלכות ציצית, הלכות ברכות, הלכות מילה. נוסח התפלה
 Sefer Zemannim (Hebrew: ספר זְמַנִּים)
 Volume 3: הלכות שבת, הלכות ערובין, הלכות שביתת עשור
 Volume 4a: הלכות שביתת יום טוב, הלכות חמץ ומצה, נוסח ההגדה
 Volume 4b: הלכות שופר וסוכה ולולב, הלכות שקלים, הלכות קדוש החדש, הלכות תעניות, הלכות מגלה וחנוכה
 Sefer Nashim (Hebrew: ספר נָשִׁים)
 Volume 5: הלכות אישות
 Volume 6: הלכות גרושין, הלכות יבום וחליצה, הלכות נערה בתולה, הלכות שוטה
 Sefer Kedusshah (Hebrew: ספר קְדוּשָּׁה)
 Volume 7: הלכות אסורי ביאה
 Volume 8a: הלכות מאכלות אסורות
 Volume 8b: הלכות שחיטה
 Sefer Hafla'ah (Hebrew: ספר הַפלָאָה): Volume 9: הלכות שבועות, הלכות נדרים, הלכות נזירות, הלכות ערכים וחרמים
 Sefer Zera'im (Hebrew: ספר זְרָעִים)
 Volume 10: הלכות כלאים, הלכות מתנות ענים, הלכות תרומות
 Volume 11: הלכות מעשרות, הלכות מעשר שני ונטע רבעי, הלכות בכורים עם שאר מתנות כהונה שבגבולין, הלכות שמטה ויובל
 Sefer Avodah (Hebrew: ספר עֲבוֹדָה)
 Volume 12: הלכות בית הבחירה, הלכות כלי המקדש והעובדים בו, הלכות ביאת המקדש, הלכות אסורי מזבח, הלכות מעשה הקרבנות
 Volume 13: הלכות תמידין ומוספין, הלכות פסולי המוקדשין, הלכות עבודת יום הכפורים, הלכות מעילה
 Sefer HaKarbanot (Hebrew: ספר הַקָּרבָּנוֹת): Volume 14: הלכות קרבן פסח, הלכות חגיגה, הלכות בכורות, הלכות שגגות, הלכות מחוסרי כפרה, הלכות תמורה
 Sefer Taharah (Hebrew: ספר טָהֳרָה)
 Volume 15: הלכות טומאת מת, הלכות פרה אדומה, הלכות טומאת צרעת, הלכות מטמאי משכב ומושב
 Volume 16: הלכות שאר אבות הטומאות, הלכות טומאת אוכלין, הלכות כלים, הלכות מקוות
 Sefer Nezikin (Hebrew: ספר נְזִיקִין): Volume 17: הלכות נזיקי ממון, הלכות גנבה, הלכות גזלה ואבדה, הלכות חובל ומזיק, הלכות רוצח ושמירת נפש
 Sefer Kinyan (Hebrew: ספר קִניָן)
 Volume 18: הלכות מכירה, הלכות זכייה ומתנה
 Volume 19: הלכות שכנים, הלכות שלוחין ושותפין, הלכות עבדים
 Sefer Mishpatim (Hebrew: ספר מִשׁפָּטִים)
 Volume 20: הלכות שכירות, הלכות שאלה ופקדון, הלכות מלוה ולוה
 Volume 21: הלכות טוען ונטען, הלכות נחלות
 Appended to this is Rabbi Kapach's listing and explanation of "מפי השמועה" and "מפי הקבלה" in Mishneh Torah (34 pages).
 Sefer Shofetim (Hebrew: ספר שׁוֹפְטִים)
 Volume 22: הלכות סנהדרין והעונשין המסורין להן, הלכות עדות
 Volume 23: הלכות ממרים, הלכות אבל, הלכות מלכים ומלחמות 

 Sefer Hamitzvot, in original Arabic with facing Hebrew translation (5731 [1971]). This edition succeeded the Rambam L'Am edition of Sefer HaMitzvot (5718 [1958]) for which Rabbi Qafih provided his translation and notes. In his later edition Rabbi Qafih repeatedly called out the former edition for its printing of errors against his agreement and without his knowledge, emphasizing that it should not be relied upon.
 Based on what was then the newly-published edition of Rambam L'Am, Rabbi Dr. Charles B. Chavel translated Sefer HaMitzvot, published in two volumes by the Soncino Press in 1967 as The Commandments (Sefer Ha-Mitzvoth of Maimonides). Soncino Press described their edition as "the first complete English translation of the Sefer Ha-Mitzvoth based upon Rabbi Kapach's work." As Rabbi Bell would later note, "neither Rabbi Chavel nor Soncino were aware of Rabbi Kapach's reservations about the 1958 edition," as only 13 years thereafter, in 1971, would Rabbi Qafih supersede this Mossad Harav Kook edition.
 Based on Rabbi Qafih's edition with the original Arabic, Rabbi Berel Bell produced an English translation (from Qafih's Hebrew) of the mitzvot in two volumes. His English translation, however, lacks Maimonides' Introduction and Principles.
 Guide for the Perplexed in original Arabic with facing Hebrew translation (later editions have Hebrew only, in one volume).
 Iggeroth haRambam, in original Arabic with facing Hebrew translation.
 T'shuvot haRambam (with either Rabbi Qafih's translations or summarizations), printed in Qafih's notes throughout the Mishneh Torah. These translations were posthumously collected and appended to the end of the reprint (Rubin Mass and Makhon Moshe, Jerusalem, 2014) of Blau's four-volume edition of Maimonides' Responsa.
 Ba'alei ha-Nefesh by Ra'avad with Sela' ha-Maḥloḳot of the רז"ה.
 Responsa and Rulings of Ra'avad (Hebrew: תשובות ופסקים לראב"ד).
 Questions and Responsa of the Ritva (Hebrew: שו"ת הריטב"א), Jerusalem, Mossad Harav Kook, 1978, edited with an introduction and notes.
 Maor Haafelah by Nethanel ben Isaiah, in original Arabic with accompanying Hebrew translation.
 Commentary on the Early Prophets by Avraham ben Shlomo, in original Arabic with facing Hebrew translation (in multiple volumes).
 Midrash Habeiur, in original Arabic with facing Hebrew translation.
 שאלות ר' חטר בן שלמה, in original Arabic with facing Hebrew translation.
 ספר המעלות לדרגות ימות המשיח, in original Arabic with facing Hebrew translation.
 Kitāb al-Ḥaqāyiq - Sefer ha-Amitiyyuth (כתאב אלחקאיק - ספר האמתיות), in original Arabic with facing Hebrew translation.
 Collected Papers (three volumes) 
 Volume 1 (1989): Halacha [and Divrei Torah], Philosophy, Sages' Writings. Among its contents the following are freely available online (from their original sources of publication):
 בירור בדין „הגונב את הקסוה" (originally published in 1983).
 על חודש תמוז (originally published in 1964).
 Responsa of Rabbeinu Jacob of Ramerupt (Rabbeinu Tam) (originally published in 1968).
 Volume 2 (1989): Maimonidean Doctrine, Yemenite Jewry. Among its contents the following are freely available online (most from their original sources of publication):
 "ופליגא" במשנת הרמב"ם (originally published in 1983).
 Hayyim Habshush's "History of the Jews in Yemen" (originally published in 1958; with English abstract).
 The Book Dofi Ha-zeman ("The Vicissitudes of Time"), of R. Sa'id Sa'adi: Events befalling the Jews of Yemen during the Years 1717—1726 (originally published in 1956; with English abstract).
 Tribulations of Yemen (originally published in 1961; with English abstract).
 משפטים בתימן (newly typeset online edition).
 בתי כנסת בתימן (newly typeset online edition, with photos absent from Collected Papers).
 כותבי ומעתיקי ספרים בתימן (newly typeset online edition, with photos absent from Collected Papers).
 מעמד האשה בתימן (newly typeset online edition).
 'לאז' או 'כחאל' (originally published in 1982).
 Volume 3 (posthumously published in 2001): Sources, Miscellanies. Among its contents the following is freely available online (from its original source of publication):
 הערות אחדות על שני תרגומים מערבית לעברית (originally published in 1994).
Material not collected therein (but listed in the bibliography)
 Shavuoth in Yemen.
 Portions of three unknown early Judeo-Arabic commentaries to the Bible and a Judeo-Arabic commentary to Sefer Yetzira. 

 המקרא ברמב"ם (index to the verses of the Bible in the Rambam).
 Halikhoth Teiman: Jewish Life in Sanà (first edition published in 1961; second edition in 1963; third edition in 1987 ). Posthumously, a repaginated and newly typeset edition has been published.
 Shivath Tsiyyon (1950s), a new edition of the Baladi Yemenite prayer book.
 Yemenite Passover Aggadta with four Yemenite commentaries, the Arabic among them translated into Hebrew.
 Siaḥ Yerushalayim (1993), the newest edition of the Baladi Yemenite prayer book.
 First published posthumously:
 Rabbi Yosef Kafiḥ's Notebook on the Plants of the Mishna (published by Dr. Zohar Amar).
 קונדריס שיחת דקלים (published by Rabbi Dr. Uri Melammed).
 In volume 8 of Masorah L'Yosef: לתקופת הימים; a paper that Rabbi Yosef Kapach wrote about Rabbi Moshe Tsarum; and speeches for Bar Mitzvahs.
 Responsa of Rabbi Yosef Qafih (posthumously published):
 עדות ביהוסף (collected beth din rulings).
 שו"ת הריב"ד (with commentary by Rabbi Avraham Ḥamami) in multiple volumes.
 Responsa related to laws of family purity: appended to Taharath Moshe (2015) by Rabbi Tzfanya Arusi.
 ספר תשובות הרב קאפח (with extensive commentary by Rabbi Shalom Nagar) in multiple volumes.

Recorded Lectures
Posthumously, Machon Mishnat HaRambam has, to date, put out the following CDs (in MP3 format) with Rabbi Yosef Kapach's recorded lectures (Hebrew: שיעורים מפי הרה"ג יוסף קאפח):
 רס"ג
 הנבחר באמונות ובדעות (four CDs)
 רבנו בחיי
 תורת חובות הלבבות (five CDs)
 רבנו נתנאל בירב פיומי
 גן השכלים (two CDs)
 רמב"ם
 הקדמה לפירוש המשנה (one CD)
 פירוש המשנה
 פירוש לפרק עשירי – מסכת סנהדרין - פרק "חלק" (one CD)
 הקדמה למסכת אבות המכונה "שמונה פרקים" (one CD)
 מורה הנבוכים (eleven CDs)
 אגרות (one CD)
Based on the above, the following has been published in book form:
 Lectures of Rabbi Yosef Qafih:
 Volume 1: Maimonides' Introduction to the Mishnah Commentary
 Volume 2: Maimonides' Introduction to Perek HelekAwards and recognition
 In both 1962 and 1973, Qafiḥ was awarded the Bialik Prize for Jewish thought.
 In 1969, he was awarded the Israel Prize for Jewish studies. His wife, Rabbanit Bracha Qafih, was also awarded the Israel Prize for her special contributions to society and the State in 1999, in recognition of her extensive charitable work (this was the only occasion on which a married couple have both been awarded the Israel Prize).
 Qafiḥ has also won the Rabbi Kook Prize, and was awarded an honorary doctorate by Bar Ilan University.

Further reading
 Avivit Levi, הולך תמים: מורשתו, חייו ופועלו של הרב יוסף קאפח (Hebrew; Holekh Tamim: The Legacy, Life and Work of Rabbi Yosef Qafih), 2003.
 Ester Muchawsky-Schnapper, The Contribution of Rabbi Yosef Qāfiḥ to the Knowledge of Yemenite Material Culture: A Personal Account in Tema (Journal of Judeo-Yemenite Studies), #8 (Netanya, 2004), p. 15-24.
 Y. Tzvi Langermann, "Mori Yusuf": Rabbi Yosef Kafah (Qāfiḥ) (1917–2000) in Aleph (Historical Studies in Science & Judaism), #1 (2001), p. 333-340.
 Y. Tzvi Langermann, Rabbi Yosef Qafih's Modern Medieval Translation of the Guide'' in Maimonides' Guide of the Perplexed in Translation (2019), p. 257-278.

See also
List of Israel Prize recipients
List of Bialik Prize recipients

References

External links
 The Friedberg Jewish Manuscript Society's Judeo-Arabic Corpus (accessible with free login) makes available the body of numerous Judeo-Arabic works translated and published by Rabbi Qafih (sans independent Hebrew material like editor introductions), with a choice of viewing the original page images alongside a transcription of the printed Arabic text–the latter of which is fully searchable through the website.
 Selected comments of Rabbi Yosef Kafach
 Color picture of Rabbi Yosef Qafih (posted at ).
 English translation of Sefer Hamitzvot based on Rabbi Kapach's Hebrew translation by Rabbi Berel Bell (sans Maimonides' Introduction and Principles).
 Rabbi Ovadia Yosef's transcribed speech (Hebrew)
 Rabbi Mordechai Eliyahu's transcribed speech (Hebrew)
 OU Obituary

Yemenite Orthodox rabbis
Religious Zionist Orthodox rabbis
Mercaz HaRav alumni
Israel Prize in Jewish studies recipients
Israel Prize Rabbi recipients
Yemeni emigrants to Mandatory Palestine
Israeli Orthodox rabbis
1917 births
2000 deaths
Orthodox rabbis in Mandatory Palestine
Exponents of Jewish law
Researchers of Yemenite Jewry
Authors of books on Jewish law